Greg Simon is an American political aide who supported Vice Presidents Joe Biden and Al Gore. His private sector work is concentrated in the pharmaceutical, biotechnology, and telecommunications sectors. Simon is credited with advancing key federal health care and telecommunications policies.

Early life and education 
Simon was a rock 'n roll drummer until he was thirty. He received his J.D. degree from the University of Washington School of Law in 1983 where he was a member of the Law Review and the Moot Court. He has a B.A. in history from the University of Arkansas.

Career 
Simon was an aide to Vice President Al Gore, eventually working as his Chief Domestic Policy Advisor (‘93-’97) where he shepherded the 1996 Telecommunications Reform Act, crafted regulations for the biotech industry, and represented VP Gore on the National Economic Council. 

Simon left the White House to found lobbying firm Simon Strategies. With his firm Simon lobbied for energy companies Enron and Southern Company, and telecom companies such as Sony, Netscape, Motorola, Global Crossing, AOL, and Cisco. Simon also lobbied for domain registrar Network Solutions.While maintaining his lobbying practice, Simon was a bundler and top advisor for Gore’s 2000 presidential campaign.

Simon served as Executive Director for both the Biden Cancer Initiative (‘17-’19) and the White House Cancer Moonshot Task Force (2016). He also served on the Health and Human Services review team for the Obama-Biden transition in 2008.

After working on the Obama-Biden transition team, Simon joined Pfizer as a Senior Vice President in charge of worldwide policy and patient engagement (2009-12).

References 

Al Gore
Clinton administration personnel
University of Washington alumni
University of Arkansas alumni

Year of birth missing (living people)
Living people